Jiangwan Town is a station on Shanghai Metro Line 3. It served as the northern terminus of Line 3 from its opening on 26 December 2000 until 18 December 2006, when the northern extension to  opened. Next to this station is a big supermarket with a lot of small clothes stores and some dinner locations. This station is used by people from a relatively large area, including many students living on Fudan University and Tongji University campuses. Both of these are less than 20 minutes' walk away.

References

Shanghai Metro stations in Hongkou District
Line 3, Shanghai Metro
Railway stations in China opened in 2000
Railway stations in Shanghai